Burrows is an English surname, and may refer to:

 Abe Burrows (1910-1985), American humorist and author
 Adrian Burrows (b. 1959), former English footballer
 Alex Burrows (b. 1981), Canadian ice hockey player
 Andy Burrows (b. 1979), British musician
 Arthur Burrows (radio broadcaster), British broadcaster
 Arthur Burrows (English cricketer) (1865-1890), English cricketer
 Arthur Burrows (Australian cricketer) (1903-1984), Australian cricketer
 Arthur Burrows (footballer) (1919–2005), former English footballer
 Billy Drago, born William Eugene Burrows Jr. (1945-2019), American actor
 Bernard Burrows (1910-2002), British diplomat
 Charlotte Burrows, American lawyer; chair of the Equal Employment Opportunity Commission (EEOC) 
 Craig Burrows (b. 1972), Australian rules footballer
 Daniel Burrows (1766-1858), US Representative from Connecticut
 David Burrows (disambiguation) several people
 Darren E. Burrows (b. 1966), American actor
 Don Burrows (1926–2020), Australian jazz and swing musician
 Edward Burrows (1917-1988), American pacifist
 Edwin G. Burrows (1943-2018), American professor of history 
 Elsie M. Burrows (1913-1986), English botanist
 Eva Burrows (1929-2015), the 13th General of The Salvation Army
 Faith Burrows (1904-1997), American cartoonist
 Frank Burrows (1944-2021), Scottish football manager and former player
 Frederick Burrows (1887-1973), British politician
 Frederick Burrows (Australian soldier) (1897–1973), Australian soldier
 George Burrows (disambiguation) several people
 Harry Burrows (b. 1941), former English footballer
 Herbert Burrows (1845-1922), British social activist
 Horace Burrows (1910-1969), English footballer
 Jacen Burrows (b. 1972), American comic book artist
 James Burrows (b. 1944), American economist
 James Burrows (b. 1949), American television director
 Jeff Burrows (b. 1968), Canadian drummer
 John Burrows (1913-1987, American baseball player
 John Burrows (1849-1894), English cricketer (AKA John Selby)
 Jonathan Burrows, English choreographer
 Joseph Henry Burrows (1840-1914), US Representative from Missouri
 Julius C. Burrows (1837-1915), US Representative from Michigan
 Larry Burrows (1926-1971), English photojournalist
 Latham A. Burrows (1792-1855), New York politician
 Leonard Burrows (1857-1940), English bishop
 Lorenzo Burrows (1805-1885), American merchant banker and politician
 Malandra Burrows (b. 1965), English actress
 Marc Burrows (1978-2009), English footballer
 Michael Burrows (b. 1963), British computer scientist
 Michael Burrows (bishop) (b. 1961), Bishop in the Church of Ireland
 Mike Burrows (1943-2022), English bicycle designer
 Montagu Burrows (1819-1905), English naval officer and Oxford professor
 Patrick Burrows (b. 1959), Canadian ice hockey player
 Phil Burrows (b. 1980), New Zealand field hockey player
 Randall K. Burrows, American politician
 Robert Burrows (1871-1943), English cricketer
 Roland Burrows (1882-1952), judge and legal writer. 
 Ronald Burrows (1867-1920), British academic
 Saffron Burrows (b. 1972), English American actress
 Stephen Burrows, American film actor and director
 Stuart Burrows (b. 1933), Welsh operatic tenor
 Terry Burrows, English author and musician
 Terry Burrows (baseball) (b. 1968), American baseball player
 Theodore Arthur Burrows (1857-1929), Canadian politician
 Tom Burrows (b. 1985), English cricketer with Hampshire
 Tom Burrows (footballer) (1886-??), English goalkeeper with Southampton
 Tony Burrows (b. 1942), British session singer
 Vinie Burrows, American Broadway actress
 Warren Booth Burrows (1877-1952), US Federal judge
 Wilf Burrows (1902–1985), English professional footballer
 William Ward Burrows I (1758-1805), US Navy second Commandant
 William Ward Burrows II (1785-1813), US Navy officer
 Winfrid Burrows (1858-1929), English bishop

Fictional characters
 Lincoln "L. J." Burrows Jr., character on Prison Break
 The Burrows family, the central characters of the Tunnels series of novels

See also
 Burroughs (surname)
 Burrow (surname)
 Burrowes (surname)

English-language surnames